Staryi Maidan, formerly Starozakrevskyi Maidan until 1938 (literally "Old Zakrevsky Maidan", maidan meaning "public square"), is a village located between Derazhnia and Vovkovyntsi, in Khmelnytskyi Raion of Khmelnytskyi Oblast near Kalna in the Podolia region of Ukraine. It belongs to Vovkovyntsi urban hromada, one of the hromadas of Ukraine. It was a Jewish agricultural colony established in 1844, but today is mostly populated by ethnic Ukrainians.

History
It was the largest and most prosperous agricultural colony near Derazhnia, at one point in the late 19th century it had a population of over 700. The colony continued until it was turned into a kolkhoz and renamed Staryi Maidan by the Soviets in 1928. It was nicknamed "Yiddish Maidan" by its residents, primarily to distinguish it from the nearby village of Novyi Maidan ("New Maidan"). 

Due to periodic pogroms and to impoverished conditions in the first two decades of the 20th century, many residents emigrated to the United States (and some to Israel). Those who settled in America formed a burial society, Yiddish Meidan Verein, purchased a plot in Beth David Cemetery in Elmont, New York, where many of the early immigrants are buried. In 1941, the remaining residents of Staryi Maidan were moved to the Derazhnia ghetto and eventually shot to death by the Nazis.

Until 18 July 2020, Staryi Maidan belonged to Derazhnia Raion. The raion was abolished in July 2020 as part of the administrative reform of Ukraine, which reduced the number of raions of Khmelnytskyi Oblast to three. The area of Derazhnia Raion was merged into Khmelnytskyi Raion.

Bibliography
Chapin, David A. and Weinstock, Ben, The Road from Letichev: The history and culture of a forgotten Jewish community in Eastern Europe, Volume 1.  iUniverse, Lincoln, NE, 2000. (Chapter 9 "The Jewish Farmers of Podolia" provides a very detailed history of the colony.)
Chapin, David A. and Weinstock, Ben, The Road from Letichev: The history and culture of a forgotten Jewish community in Eastern Europe, Volume 2.  iUniverse, Lincoln, NE, 2000.

References

Jewish Ukrainian history
Shtetls
Holocaust locations in Ukraine
Former Jewish agricultural colonies of Podolia Governorate
Villages in Khmelnytskyi Raion